Young New England is the fourth studio album by pop punk band Transit.

Production
Young New England was recorded at Maximum Sound Studios in Danvers, Massachusetts in December 2012. Ted Hutt produced the sessions, with additional production from Gary Cioffi on "Hang It Up" and "Hazy". Cioffi also served as the engineer; John Delloiacono did additional engineering. Cioffi mixed the album, before it was mastered by Nathan James at The Vault Mastering Studios.

Release
It was released on April 2, 2013, through Rise Records. In October and November, the band supported Taking Back Sunday on their headlining US tour. In April and May 2014, the band supported Mayday Parade on their So Devastating, It's Unnatural Tour in the US. Following this, the group supported Man Overboard on their headlining North American tour in May and June, dubbed The Heart Attack Tour.

Track listing
All music and lyrics by Transit.

Personnel
Personnel per booklet.

Transit
 Joe Boynton – vocals
 Tim Landers – guitar
 Torre Cioffi – guitar
 PJ Jefferson – bass
 Daniel Frazier – drums

Production
 Ted Hutt – producer
 Gary Cioffi – additional production (tracks 7 and 11) engineer, mixing
 John Delloiacono – additional engineering
 Nathan James
 Troy David Millhoupt – art direction, design
 Dan Brenton – photography

References

2013 albums
Transit (band) albums
Rise Records albums